Cynthia Nocollege Majeke is a South African politician affiliated with the United Democratic Movement party. Between 2014 and 2019, Majeke served as a Member of Parliament in the National Assembly.

Parliamentary career
A member of the United Democratic Movement, Majeke stood as a candidate in the general election on 7 May 2014.  She was third on her party's regional-to-national list. She was not elected to the National Assembly at first, however, Lennox Gaehler opted against serving in the National Assembly to go to the National Council of Provinces. The UDM subsequently chose Majeke.

Tenure
Majeke's term as an MP began on 21 May 2014.

In August 2017, she and other MPs on the Portfolio Committee on Basic Education were involved in a car accident outside Paarl in the Western Cape. Minister of Basic Education, Angie Motshekga, visited her in hospital.

Majeke left parliament on 7 May 2019.

Committee assignments
On 20 June 2014, committees were established, and she received her assignments. Her committee memberships were as follows:

Portfolio Committee on Basic Education
Portfolio Committee on Health
Portfolio Committee on Human Settlements
Portfolio Committee on Women in the Presidency
Committee on Multi-party Women's Caucus

References

Living people
Year of birth missing (living people)
Xhosa people
People from the Eastern Cape
United Democratic Movement (South Africa) politicians
Members of the National Assembly of South Africa
Women members of the National Assembly of South Africa